All in a Family was an immensely popular Hong Kong drama that first screened in 1994. It was based on the British television series Till Death Us Do Part.

Cast
 Chan Chun Wah - Father/Mr Tang
 Siu-ha Chan - Autumn
 Angela Chow - Jackie
 Andrew Johnston - Cameron
 Priscilla Koo - Spring
 Wilson Lam - Summer
 Scudder Smith - Scudder
 Pierre Tremblay - John
 May Tse - Mother/Mrs Tang

Episodes
Series 1
 Father and Daughter
 When Summer met Jackie
 HONG KONG - My Home
 New Kid In The Village
 My Old Mom
 School-time
 Roots
 Farewell to My Village
 The Courtship
 The Wedding
 A Family Affair

External links
 
 All In A Family at The Encyclopedia of Television

Hong Kong television soap operas
TVB dramas
1994 Hong Kong television series debuts
1996 Hong Kong television series endings
1990s Hong Kong television series
Cantonese-language television shows